KDMC may refer to:

 Kalyan-Dombivali Municipal Corporation, the governing body of Kalyan-Dombivli, Maharashtra, India
 KDMC-FM, a radio station (91.3 FM) licensed to serve Van Buren, Missouri, United States
 KDMC-LP, a defunct low-power radio station (103.7 FM) formerly licensed to serve Cape Girardeau, Missouri
 King's Daughters Medical Center, Ashland, Kentucky, United States

See also
 KDC (disambiguation)
 KDM (disambiguation)